CCIR System I is an analogue broadcast television system. It was first used in the Republic of Ireland starting in 1962 as the 625-line broadcasting standard to be used on VHF Band I and Band III, sharing Band III with 405-line System A signals radiated in the north and east of the country. The UK started its own 625-line television service in 1964 also using System I, but on UHF only – the UK has never used VHF for 625-line television except for some cable relay distribution systems.

Since then, System I has been adopted for use by Hong Kong, Macau, the Falkland Islands and South Africa. The Republic of Ireland has (slowly) extended its use of System I onto the UHF bands.

As of late 2012, analogue television is no longer transmitted in either the UK or the Republic of Ireland. South Africa is still broadcasting in System I, but plans to end the service in 2022.

Specifications 

Some of the important specs are listed below.

A frame is the total picture. The frame rate is the number of pictures displayed in one second. But each frame is actually scanned twice interleaving odd and even lines. Each scan is known as a field (odd and even fields.) So field rate is twice the frame rate. In each frame there are 625 lines (or 312.5 lines in a field.) So line rate (line frequency) is 625 times the frame frequency or 625•25=15625 Hz.

The total RF bandwidth of System I (as originally designed with its single FM audio subcarrier) was about 7.4 MHz, allowing System I signals to be transmitted in 8.0 MHz wide channels with an ample 600 kHz guard zone between channels.

In specs, sometimes, other parameters such as vestigial sideband characteristics and gamma of display device are also given.

Colour TV 
System I has only been used with the PAL colour systems, but it would have been technically possible to use SECAM or a 625-line variant of the NTSC color system. However, apart from possible technical tests in the 1960s, this has never been done officially.

When used with PAL, the colour subcarrier is 4.43361875 MHz and the sidebands of the PAL signal have to be truncated on the high-frequency side at +1.066 MHz (matching the rolloff of the luminance signal at +5.5 MHz). On the low-frequency side, the full 1.3 MHz sideband width is radiated. (This behaviour would cause some U/V crosstalk in the NTSC system, but delay-line PAL hides such artefacts.)

Additionally, to minimise beat-patterns between the chrominance subcarrier and the sound subcarrier, when PAL is used with System I, the sound subcarrier is moved slightly off the originally-specified 6.0 MHz to 5.9996 MHz. This is such a slight frequency shift that no alterations needed to be made to existing System I television sets when the change was made.

No colour encoding system has any effect on the bandwidth of system I as a whole.

Improved audio
Enhancements have been made to the specification of System I's audio capabilities over the years. Starting in the late 1980s and early 1990s it became possible to add a digital signal carrying NICAM sound. This extension to audio capability has completely eaten the guard band between channels, indeed there would be a small amount of analogue-digital crosstalk between the NICAM signal of a transmitter on channel N and the vestigial sideband of a transmission on channel N+1. Good channel planning means that under normal situations no ill effects are seen or heard.

The NICAM system used with System I adds a 700 kHz wide digital signal, and needs to be placed at least 552 kHz from the audio subcarrier.

Transmission channels

Republic of Ireland from 1962 

VHF Band 1 was already discontinued for TV broadcasting well before Ireland's digital switchover.

♥ No longer used for TV broadcasting.

UHF takeup in Ireland was slower than in the UK. A written answer in the Dáil Éireann (Irish parliament) shows that even by mid 1988 Ireland was 
transmitting on UHF from only four main transmitters and 11 relays.

United Kingdom from 1964 

† Channels 35 to 37, between UHF Band IV and Band V, were originally reserved for radio astronomy. However, from 1997 until the finish of analogue TV in the UK in 2012, the UK used these channels for analogue broadcasts of Channel 5.

§ Channel 69 was allocated, but never used in the UK.

See also 

Broadcast television systems
Television transmitter
Transposer

Notes and references

External links 
 World Analogue Television Standards and Waveforms
 Fernsehnormen aller Staaten und Gebiete der Welt

ITU-R recommendations
Television technology
I, System
Broadcast engineering
CCIR System